Sara Husein (born 16 December 1998) is a Macedonian footballer who plays as a forward and midfielder for the North Macedonia national team.

International career
Husein made her debut for the North Macedonia national team on 27 November 2020, coming on as a substitute for Aleksandra Ristovska against Kazakhstan.

References

1998 births
Living people
Women's association football forwards
Women's association football midfielders
Macedonian women's footballers
Albanians in North Macedonia
North Macedonia women's international footballers